The Monroe Pirates were a minor league baseball team, based in Monroe, North Carolina, in 1971. The team was the city's second team in the Western Carolinas League, after the Monroe Indians left for Sumter, South Carolina in 1970. The club was a class-A affiliate of the Pittsburgh Pirates and went on to produce the notable major league careers, of Dave Parker, Ed Ott, Tony Armas and Mario Mendoza.

1971 season

References

Defunct minor league baseball teams
Pittsburgh Pirates minor league affiliates
Professional baseball teams in North Carolina
1971 establishments in North Carolina
1971 disestablishments in North Carolina
Defunct baseball teams in North Carolina
Baseball teams disestablished in 1971
Baseball teams established in 1971
Defunct Western Carolinas League teams